The 2006 Amsterdam Admirals season was the 12th season for the team in the NFL Europe League (NFLEL). The team was led by head coach Bart Andrus in his sixth year, and played its home games at Amsterdam ArenA in Amsterdam, Netherlands. They finished the regular season in first place with a record of seven wins and three losses. In World Bowl XIV, Amsterdam lost to the Frankfurt Galaxy 7–22.

Offseason

Free agent draft

Personnel

Staff

Roster

Schedule

Standings

Game summaries

Week 1: vs Berlin Thunder

Week 2: at Cologne Centurions

Week 3: vs Frankfurt Galaxy

Week 4: at Berlin Thunder

Week 5: vs Rhein Fire

Week 6: at Rhein Fire

Week 7: at Hamburg Sea Devils

Week 8: vs Cologne Centurions

Week 9: at Frankfurt Galaxy

Week 10: vs Hamburg Sea Devils

World Bowl XIV

Honors
After the completion of the regular season, the All-NFL Europe League team was selected by the NFLEL coaching staffs, members of a media panel and fans voting online at NFLEurope.com. Overall, Amsterdam had eight players selected. The selections were:

 Derrick Ballard, linebacker
 Skyler Fulton, wide receiver
 Gibran Hamdan, quarterback
 Ryan Killeen, placekicker
 Noriaki Kinoshita, special teams player
 Tyler Lenda, center
 Chad Lucas, wide receiver
 Jeff Roehl, tackle

Additionally, Hamdan and defensive tackle Tony Brown were named offensive and co-defensive MVPs, respectively. Hamdan, who was in his third season with the Admirals, set an NFLEL record by posting a passer rating of 113.4, leading his team to a 6–1 record before suffering a season-ending injury. He completed 102 of 162 passes for a league-leading 1,629 yards with 12 touchdowns. In the Week 3 contest against Frankfurt he became only the second quarterback in league history to post a perfect 158.3 rating. Brown, who shared the award with Cologne Centurions' linebacker Philippe Gardent, became the third player in NFLEL history to win defensive MVP honors despite not being voted to the All-NFLEL team. He recorded four sacks and 40 tackles during the season.

Notes

References

Amsterdam
Amsterdam Admirals seasons